The 12th Annual Gotham Independent Film Awards, presented by the Independent Filmmaker Project, were held on September 26, 2002 and were hosted by Rosie Perez and John Turturro. At the ceremony, Ang Lee and Bingham Ray were honored with Career Tributes, Whitney Dow and Marco Williams received the Anthony Radziwell Documentary Achievement Award and Julianne Moore was awarded the Actor Award.

Winners and nominees

Breakthrough Actor
 Maggie Gyllenhaal – Secretary

Breakthrough Director (Open Palm Award)
 Eric Eason – Manito
 Bertha Bay-Sa Pan – Face
 Ethan Hawke – Chelsea Walls
 Moisés Kaufman – The Laramie Project
 Peter Mattei – Love in the Time of Money
 Fisher Stevens – Just a Kiss

Anthony Radziwell Documentary Achievement Award
 Whitney Dow and Marco Williams for Two Towns of Jasper

Actor Award
 Julianne Moore

Career Tributes
 Ang Lee
 Bingham Ray

References

External links
 

2002
2002 film awards